Tim Sander (born 27 July 1978 in Berlin) is a German actor.

Selected filmography

Films 
 2001: 
 2003: 
 2014: Joy of Fatherhood

TV 
 1998–2002: Gute Zeiten, schlechte Zeiten
 2004: 18 – Allein unter Mädchen
 2005–2006: Unter den Linden – Das Haus Gravenhorst
 2006–2007: Verliebt in Berlin

References

External links

1978 births
Living people
German male television actors
German male film actors